The Drummond family is an American ranching family from Oklahoma. The family is one of the largest land owning families in the state of Oklahoma and the United States. In 2017, the family owned   according to The Land Report magazine. In 2022, the family was the largest land owning family in Osage County owning about 9% of the county.

19th century: Settling Among the Osage
The family's founding patriarch was Frederick Drummond (1864–1913) who moved to Osage County in 1886. Frederick had immigrated to the United States from Scotland in 1882. He briefly lived in New York, Texas, and St. Louis before being hired as clerk for the Osage Mercantile Company in the Osage Nation. Frederick would marry his wife, Addie Gentner of Coffeyville, Kansas on July 6, 1890. Fred and Addie had six children including three sons, Roy Cecil Drummond, Frederick Gentner Drummond, and Alfred Alexander "Jack" Drummond.

20th century: Osage Controversies and Increasing Wealth

In 1903, the Drummonds moved to Hominy, Oklahoma where Frederick founded the Hominy Trading Company. The Victorian-style Fred and Adeline Drummond House was built in 1905 in Hominy, Oklahoma by Frederick and Addie. In 1908, Frederick Drummond became the first mayor of Hominy. Frederick and his son Frederick Gentner both spoke the Osage language. During the Reign of Terror in Osage County the Drummonds were creditors against and administrators for Osage estates. They also owned a funeral home that performed funerals for the deceased that would be paid for by the estate. Some families sold their allotments to the Drummonds to cover the costs of their debt to the Hominy Trading Company.

Frederick Drummond died in 1913. Jack Drummond claimed at the time of his father's death, Frederick Drummond owned about 1,200 acres. After their father's death in 1913, Jack and Cecil Drummond founded Drummond Cattle Co., which over the next 50 years grew into a 200,000-head operation. Frederick Gentner Drummond took over running the Hominy Trading Company since he spoke Osage.

Jack worked at the store starting in about 1920 and overcharged Osage customers, saying "those shirts would cost us maybe $6 or $8 a shirt and I'd get $50 or $60 a shirt." Strained relationships with family members and neighbor resentment towards Jack Drummond as an Osage County "land hog" led him in 1924 to start buying land in the opposite part of the state in Marshall County, Oklahoma. In 1925, during the Reign of Terror in Osage County, Jack Drummond acquired one-half of an Osage head right for $20,050. He later acquired a further another one-fourth of a head right in 1928 for $11,250. He purchased the head right from O.V. Pope, a white rancher who had inherited one and a half head rights after his Osage wife Nah-me-tsa-he (who was thirty years his senior) died. In 1926, the Drummonds partnered with the Mullendores ranching family to buy William Hale's ranch.

In the 1930s Jack Drummond helped form a statewide cooperative marketing association so ranchers in the state could take advantage of government-backed loans. He was considered a leader of the livestock industry and was an innovator in herd improvement. Jack was a strong supporter of the Federal Land Bank.

In 1941, Frederick Gentner, Cecil, and Jack were sued in the Northern District of Oklahoma for "conspir[ing] and devis[ing] a scheme to defraud." Judge Kennamer dismissed the case for lack of evidence.

The Drummond house was deeded to the Oklahoma Historical Society in 1980 and placed on the National Register of Historic Places in 1981.

21st century: Reality Television and Public Office

In the 21st century the Drummond family gained national attention due to the popularity of Ree Drummond's blog and television show The Pioneer Woman. The show brought tourism to Pawhuska, Oklahoma where sales tax revenue increased by 30–50% after the opening of Ree Drummond's Mercantile store. The Drummonds donated for the creation of a new high school football stadium for Pawhuska High School and for the building of an animal shelter in town.

In 2017 the family owned   according to The Land Report magazine. In 2022, the family was the largest land owning family in Osage County owning about 9% of the county.

In 2022, two Drummond family members clashed with the Osage Nation over a Drummond-led plan to privatize a road near the Drummond Family Ranch: the Drummond group claimed that the road was used by people causing mischief and that Ree Drummond's celebrity was attracting too much traffic, whereas the Osage Nation argued the road was important for tribal citizens to access land owned by Osage Nation which is also on the road. The Osage County Board of Commissioners voted unanimously that the petition did not merit a hearing.

Gentner Drummond

In 2012, the Bigheart Times reported that Gentner Drummond, who was representing his cousin Thatcher Drummond in a criminal proceeding, called their reporter Louise Red Corn as a witness in a case she did not witness and had no personal connection to in order to prevent her from being able to report on the matter (she was dismissed as a witness by the court).  
In 2013, Gentner Drummond represented his cousin Jana Drummond Evans in her divorce case. During the proceedings, Jana  testified under oath that Gentner encouraged her to lie to the court about her county of residency for strategic advantage in her divorce case (however, during his 2018 campaign, Drummond maintained reporting on the testimony was politically motivated).  In 2015, Special Judge Lisa Hammond wrote in the divorce decree that Evans had lied about her residence "to support her efforts to establish venue in a county where she apparently believed the Drummond family name would provide her an advantage."

In 2022, Gentner Drummond was the Republican nominee for Attorney General of Oklahoma.

Family tree

Frederick Drummond (1864–1913),  Addie Gentner
Roy Cecil Drummond (1892–1981)
Gentner Drummond
Leslie Drummond  Carol Ann Drummond
Gentner Drummond,  Catherine Drummond (divorced);  Wendy Drummond
Cate Drummond
Alexander Drummond
Frederick Gentner Drummond (1895–1958),  Grace Ford
Frederick Ford Drummond (1931–2020)
Ford Drummond
Alfred Alexander "Jack" Drummond (1896–1989) 
Jim Drummond, (adopted)

Other Drummonds
Todd Drummond, eldest brother of Ladd and Tim Drummond who died in a car accident at 18
Tim Drummond
Ladd Drummond (AKA "Marlboro Man")
Ree Drummond, wife of Ladd Drummond, blogger, and media personality
Alex Drummond, daughter of Ladd and Ree Drummond
Bryce Drummond, son of Ladd and Ree Drummond
Paige Drummond, daughter of Ladd and Ree Drummond
Todd Drummond, son of Ladd and Ree Drummond

References

American families of Scottish ancestry
Business families of the United States
Hominy, Oklahoma
Families from Oklahoma

Political families of the United States